The men's marathon at the 2003 World Championships in Paris, France, was held on Saturday, August 30, 2003.

Medalists

Abbreviations
All times shown are in hours:minutes:seconds

Records

Intermediates

Final ranking

See also
 Athletics at the 2003 Pan American Games – Men's marathon
 2003 World Marathon Cup
 Athletics at the 2004 Summer Olympics – Men's marathon

References
 Results
 IAAF

M
Marathons at the World Athletics Championships
2003 marathons
Men's marathons
Marathons in France